St Stephen's College is a Christian Direct Subsidy Scheme co-educational secondary school in Stanley, Hong Kong. With an area of about 150,000 m2 (15 hectares), the college is the largest secondary school in Hong Kong, and is one of the very few boarding schools in the territory. Many buildings in the campus are listed in the list of historic Buildings and Declared Monuments by the Antiquities Advisory Board. When the college was founded in 1903, there were only six boarders and one day student; in the academic year 2014–2015, there were approximately 910 students studying in the college. The current principal is Ms. Carol C. Yang, commencing duty since 2011. St Stephen's College mainly uses English as a medium of instruction, and Chinese language for Chinese, Chinese history, Putonghua, visual arts and physical education. St Stephen's College is the first school in the territory having its own Heritage Trail in the school campus. The college's oldest building, the School House, was declared a monument in 2011, being one of the few schools in Hong Kong to own a Declared Monument in its campus.

History
The establishment of the college dates back to 1901. A group of prominent Chinese businessmen approached the Church Missionary Society to administer a school for their sons. The inspiration came from Dr. Pibi Nay Nay Yan. The aim was to maintain the standard of teaching and level of equipment which is comparable to the best Public Schools in England. In 1903, St Stephen's College was officially established on Bonham Road in Western District. In the 1920s, the government granted the school 40 acres (150,000 m2) on the Stanley Peninsula in recognition of outstanding contributions to education. The foundation stone was laid in April 1928 by the Governor of Hong Kong, Sir Cecil Clementi, and in May 1929, the college was fully functional in its new buildings, many of which are still in use today.

During the battle of Hong Kong in the Second World War heavy fighting took place around the college, which was among the last British strongholds to surrender to the Imperial Japanese Army. Shortly after the surrender the Imperial Japanese Army broke into the college (which served as a military hospital during the battle) and murdered wounded soldiers of the Allied forces. (see St. Stephen's College massacre) The Japanese later merged the college with part of Stanley Prison to form the Stanley Internment Camp.

The college reopened after the war and a chapel was built in 1950 to remember those who died during the Japanese occupation.

Originally a private school, St Stephen's College became a government-funded public school during the late 1900s. Since the 2008–2009 academic year, the college has become a Direct Subsidy Scheme (DSS) School, which is a historic change to the college as it freed the school from the centralised funding system that currently administers secondary education in Hong Kong. Students enrolled in the 2002 Primary 1 class at St Stephen's College Preparatory School, also based in Stanley, were the first group of students to enter the DSS system. In order to upgrade the school administrative level, this is the first secondary school in Hong Kong to employ a registered professional housing manager on its staff to manage and handle all property and facilities-related issues for and on behalf of the school.

School principal
1903 - 1914 : The Ven E. J. Barnett
1914 - 1915 : The Revd. A. D. Stewart
1915 - 1928 : The Revd. W. H. Hewitt
1928 - 1953 : Canon E. W. L. Martin
1956 - 1958 : Mr. C. T. Priestley
1958 - 1965 : Mr. J. R. F. Melluish
1965 - 1973 : The Revd. R. B. Handforth
1973 - 1974 : Ven. W. N. Cheung (Acting)
1974 - 1999 : Mr. Luke J. P. Yip (葉敬平先生)
1999 - 2004 : Mr. D. R. Too (朱業桐先生)
2005 - 2011 : Dr. Louise Y. S. Law (羅懿舒博士)
2011 - Now : Ms. Carol C. Yang (楊清女士)

Houses
St Stephen's College has divided its students into six houses with six different colours. Some names of the houses came from the names of the first few principals of the college:

Barnett House (Orange) - The Ven. E. J. Barnett;
Stewart House (Purple) - The Revd. A. D. Stewart;
Hewitt House (Red) - The Revd. W. H. Hewitt;
Martin House (Blue/White) - Canon E. W. L. Martin;
Priestley House (Green) - Mr. C. T. Priestley;
College House (Yellow)

Curriculum
Before the 2009–2010 academic year, as a local school in Hong Kong, the college had been providing three years of junior secondary, two years of senior secondary and two years of matriculation education under the English 3223 education system.

After the educational system reform was launched by the government, the college has started providing three years of senior secondary education from Form 4 since the 2009–2010 academic year under the New Senior Secondary 334 Scheme.
Meanwhile, the International Baccalaureate Diploma Programme (IBDP) had also commenced in the academic year of 2014–2015. The IBDP is a two-year curriculum and is monitored under the International Baccalaureate Organization rather than the Education Bureau of Hong Kong. Since IBDP is two years long, the college will provide a one-year IBDP bridging course to help student adapt to the essay and discussion emphasized IBDP education mode.

Publications
Many different publications are made by the college, including:
 Official School Magazine
 Chimes (鐘聲) (Biennially or triennially published since 1909) (Published in years ending in 2, 4, 7 and 9)
 Student Magazine
 E (biannually published since 2016) 
 Parent-Teacher Association
 Newsletter (會訊) (Triannually published since 1996)
 Students' Association (SA)
 Choi Choi/Choi Tsz (采茞) (Halted)
 Stephen's News (提聞) (Quarterly published by SA 2010-2011 (Alpha) in 2010 to 2011)
 Paper Two Pieces (紙兩張) (Quarterly published by SA 2011-2012 (SOAR) in 2011 to 2012)
 Echo (回聲) (Semi-annually published by SA 2012-2013 (ECHO) in 2012 to 2013)
 Chinese Society
 思藻 (Quarterly published since 2010)
 English Society
 St Stephen's College Times (Semi-annually published since 2008)
 Mathematics Society
 Mathematics Challengers Paper (2010 to 2011)
 Music Society
 MUSO Monthly (2012)

Preparatory school
St. Stephen's College Preparatory School is the preparatory primary school of St Stephen's College. St. Stephen's College Preparatory School was founded in 1938 with only one building for classrooms, boarding house and dining hall. During the Second World War, the preparatory school was used for guard quarter by the Japanese. The preparatory school re-opened in 1947, with a new building. Another building of dormitory was built in the 1950s. The preparatory school has started to give boarding places for girls in the 1960s. The preparatory school has 21 classes of more than 600 students.

Filming of TV shows and movies
St Stephen's College was used for filming advertisements, TV shows, movies and MVs.

TV shows
 Shine On You (TVB Drama, 2004)
 HK ARTchitecture (《香港築跡》) (TVB Documentary, 2010)
 (《保育好風光》) (RoadShow Documentary, 2012)
 Pleasure & Leisure (《都市閒情》) (TVB Show, 2013)
Hong Kong Stories (《香港故事 - 百年樹人》(Episode 24 of Hong Kong Stories))(RTHK Documentary, 2013)

Movies
  (1982)
 Whatever Will Be, Will Be (1995)
  (2004, 2006)
 Echoes of the Rainbow (Mei Ah Entertainment, 2010)
 Sara (2015)

Notable alumni

Politics 

Fu Bingchang (傅秉常), Nationalist Chinese and Taiwanese politician.
Hon. Chee-chen Tung (董建成), SBS, JP - member of the College Council of St Stephen's College, chairman and chief executive of Oriental Overseas International Limited, independent non-executive director of Cathay Pacific; younger brother of the first chief executive of Hong Kong Special Administrative Region, Tung Chee Hwa, GBM who is a member of the National Committee of the Chinese People's Political Consultative Conference and vice-president of Olympic Council of Asia.
Timothy Fok Tsun-ting (霍震霆), GBS, SBS, JP - former member of the Legislative Council of Hong Kong, member of the International Olympic Committee, chairman of the Sports Federation & Olympic Committee of Hong Kong, China, son to the vice-chairman of the National Committee of the Chinese People's Political Consultative Conference of the China Dr. Henry Fok Ying-tung.
The Hon. Albert Chan Wai-yip (陳偉業) - member of the Legislative Council of Hong Kong (New Territories West).
Erica Yuen Mi-ming (袁彌明) - chairlady of People Power, participated in the 2012 Legislative Council Election and gained enough votes for Raymond Chan (Slow Beat), who ranks at the top of the list, for being elected.
Bhichai Rattakul - former deputy Prime Minister of Thailand.

Business 
Dr. Raymond Chi'ien Kuo Fung (錢果豐), GBS, CBE, JP - non-executive chairman of MTR, chairman of Hang Seng Bank, director of HSBC, director of The Wharf Ltd., chairman of CDC Corporation, chairman of the college Council of St Stephen's College.
Peter Woo Kwong-ching (吳光正), GBM, GBS, JP - chairman of Wheelock and Company Limited, chairman of The Wharf Holdings Limited.
Raymond Chow Man-Wai (鄒文懷), OBE, GBS - founder of Golden Harvest.
Richard Eng (伍經衡) - founder, shareholder of and teacher at the large-scale tutorial school Beacon College (遵理學校); brother of artiste Christine Ng Wing-mei (伍詠薇).
Sir Sik-nin Chau (周錫年爵士) CBE, JP - first Chinese doctor of ear, nose and throat in Hong Kong, ex-senior unofficial member of Legislative Council and Executive Council, ex-chairman of Kowloon Motor Bus, ex-chairman of Dairy Farm, ex-chairman of Federation of Hong Kong Industries, ex-chairman of HKTDC; brother of another alumnus Tsun-nin Chau.
Sir Tsun-nin Chau (周埈年爵士) CBE, JP - former chairman of Canton Trust and Commercial Bank, former unofficial member of the Executive Council of Hong Kong, former unofficial member of the Legislative Council of Hong Kong; brother of another alumnus Sik-nin Chau.

Entertainment 
Erica Yuen Mi-ming (袁彌明) - winner of the Tourism Ambassador Award of 2005 Miss Hong Kong Pageant.
Sammy Leung (森美) - disc jockey of Commercial Radio Hong Kong, TV host and master of ceremony in TVB.
Ellen Wong (王愛倫) - second runner-up in the 1985 Miss Hong Kong Pageant.
Brian Tse Lap-man (謝立文) - author of "McDull" Story, husband of another author Alice Mak (麥家碧); the principal in the story are in accordance with the principal, Mr. Luke Yip, of the college while Tse was studying.

Sports
Ip Man (葉問) - martial arts Wing Chun master, martial arts teacher of Bruce Lee, attended school in 1917 at the age of 18.
Kin-yee Wan - track and field sprint athlete who competes internationally for Hong Kong, 6 record breaker of Hong Kong; wife of another alumnus Kwok-wai Pak.
Royden Lam - Hong Kong's renowned professional dart player, winner of various international dart cups.

See also
 Education in Hong Kong

References

External links

 

Protestant secondary schools in Hong Kong
Anglican schools in Hong Kong
Stanley, Hong Kong
Grade II historic buildings in Hong Kong
Educational institutions established in 1902
1902 establishments in Hong Kong
Boarding schools in Hong Kong